Veronika Hrončeková (born 2 January 1990) is a Slovak female volleyball player. She is part of the Slovakia women's national volleyball team. She competed at the 2007 Women's European Volleyball Championship, 2009 Women's European Volleyball Championship, 2019 Women's European Volleyball Championship.

Clubs
  Zvolen (none–2004)
  Slávia UK Bratislava (2004–2010)
  VK Agel Prostejov (2010–2013)
  Schweriner SC (2013–2016)
  VfB 91 Suhl (2016–2017)
  CSM Târgoviște (2017–2018)
  Strabag VC FTVŠ UK Bratislava (2018–2019)
  Hapoel Kfar Saba (2019–present)

References

External links 

 Profile on CEV

1990 births
Living people
Slovak women's volleyball players
Sportspeople from Zvolen